) is a Shinto shrine located in the city of Yasu, Shiga Prefecture, Japan. The kami worshipped at this shrine are Susanoo-no-Mikoto and Kushinadahime.

Outline
Ōsasahara Shrine was constructed in the year 986 by Echi Morozane, a local warlord. In 1414, the shrine's main hall (honden) was reconstructed by Mabuchi Sadanobu, the castellan of Iwakura Castle. Following the Meiji restoration and the establishment of the Modern system of ranked Shinto shrines under State Shinto, the shrine was officially designated a “county shrine”.

Cultural properties
Honden Reconstructed in 1414 during the middle Muromachi period, this building is a 3×3 ken, single-storied structure with an  irimoya-zukuri style  roof and a 1 ken step canopy covered by hinoki cypress  bark shingles.  It is particularly notable for the excellent construction technique of the transom and doors. The ornamental carvings are representative of Higashiyama culture.   The building was designated as National Treasure in 1961.  

Shinohara Shrine Honden Located to the left of the main shrine is a subsidiary shrine dedicated to Ishikori-dome no Mikoto.  Built in 1425, it was designated an Important Cultural Property in 1931.

Notes

See also
List of Shinto shrines
List of National Treasures of Japan (shrines)

References

External links
Official website
Shiga - Biwako Visitor's Guide
Shiga Jinja-cho

Shinto shrines in Shiga Prefecture
Ōmi Province
Yasu, Shiga
National Treasures of Japan
Important Cultural Properties  of Japan